Daniel H. Ragsdale is an American lawyer and law enforcement official. From May 2012 through May 2017 he was deputy director of U.S. Immigration and Customs Enforcement (ICE). He was named Acting Director of ICE on January 20, 2017, but was dismissed from that position on January 30, 2017 shortly after the dismissal of Sally Yates by President Donald Trump, retaining his post as deputy director. He is currently employed by GEO Group, a private-prison company.

Education
Ragsdale is a graduate of Franklin and Marshall College and holds a Juris Doctor from Fordham University School of Law.

Career

Ragsdale joined the U.S. Immigration and Naturalization Service (now Immigration & Customs Enforcement) in 1996, where he worked for the General Counsel's Office. He later became chief management officer of ICE, then chief of the Enforcement Law Division. Ragsdale became a deputy director of ICE in 2012. In 2013, his office worked to prosecute a smuggling ring which had been mislabeling the country-of-origin of honey, to skirt anti-dumping laws. In 2014 as deputy director of ICE he participated in a high-profile bust of an online child pornography ring.

He became acting director of ICE on January 20, 2017, following the inauguration of Donald Trump as president. Trump replaced Ragsdale with Thomas Homan on January 30, 2017, shortly after he fired Acting United States Attorney General Sally Yates. No explanation was given for the personnel change. Ragsdale retained his position of deputy director. The demotion of Ragsdale together with the firing of Yates has been referred to as the Monday Night Massacre.

In May 2017 he resigned from ICE to take a position with GEO Group, the second-largest private prison company in the country.

References

External links

Fordham University School of Law alumni
Franklin & Marshall College alumni
Living people
U.S. Immigration and Customs Enforcement officials
Year of birth missing (living people)
Trump administration personnel
Obama administration personnel